Brian Sanford (born September 12, 1987) is a former American football defensive end. He was signed by the Cleveland Browns as an undrafted free agent in 2010. He played college football for Temple, and was a postgraduate player at the Connecticut boarding school, Westminster School.

College career
He played college football for Temple.

Professional career

Cleveland Browns 
After going undrafted in the 2010 NFL Draft, Sanford signed with the Cleveland Browns as an undrafted free agent on May 17, 2010. He was cut on September 4, 2010. He was added to the Browns' practice squad the following day.

In 2011, Sanford appeared in 5 games for the Cleveland Browns.  In 2012, Sanford spent the first 7 weeks of the season on the practice squad until he was placed on the active roster on October 27, 2012.

On August 19, 2013, Sanford was traded to the Seattle Seahawks for offensive lineman John Moffitt. On August 20, 2013, the trade was rescinded, reportedly due to Moffitt failing his physical.

Oakland Raiders
Sanford was claimed off waivers by the Oakland Raiders on September 1, 2013.

Second stint with Cleveland 
Sanford re-signed with the Browns on December 25, 2013. He was released on May 12, 2014.

Denver Broncos
Sanford signed with the Denver Broncos in August 2014.

References

External links
Oakland Raiders bio
Cleveland Browns bio
Temple Owls bio

1987 births
Living people
Players of American football from Hartford, Connecticut
American football defensive ends
Temple Owls football players
Cleveland Browns players
Oakland Raiders players
Denver Broncos players